Mohammad Irfan (born 1982) is a Pakistani international cricketer.

Mohammad Irfan or Muhammad Irfan may also refer to:
 Mohammad Irfan (FATA cricketer) (born 1989), Pakistani first-class cricketer
 Mohammad Irfan (cricketer, born 1989), Pakistani first-class cricketer
 Mohammad Irfan (cricketer, born 1995), Pakistani first-class cricketer
 Muhammad Irfan (field hockey) (born 1990), Pakistani field hockey player
 Muhammad Irfan (footballer) (born 1984), Pakistani footballer
 Mohammad Irfan (politician) (1951–2016), Indian politician
 Mohammed Irfan (singer), Indian singer
 Mohammed Irfan, a Pakistani detainee at Guantanamo Bay (ISN 00101)
 Irfan Khan (Pakistani cricketer) (born 2002), Pakistani cricketer

See also
 Mohammed Irfan Afridi (born 1985), Ugandan cricketer